South Africa's Strongest Man is an annual strongman competition held in South Africa and features primarily South African strength athletes. Gerrit Badenhorst and Ettiene Smit has now won the title 8 times.

Official results - top three places

Results courtesy of David Horne's World of Grip

References

National strongmen competitions